is a retired Japanese judoka.

He was born in Sasebo, Nagasaki and brought up in Bungotakada, Ōita. He began judo at the age of a junior high school first grader.

In 1965, when he was student of Tenri University, got silver medal of World Championships. He also participated All-Japan Judo Championships three times, as a representative of Kinki region in 1964, 1965 and Kyūshū region in 1966. He was known as a rival of Isao Okano.

He became a teacher of the senior high school in Ōita Prefecture after graduation at a university in 1966, and entered Kuraray in 1967. He became the teacher again in 1969.

As of 2010, Yamanaka coaches judo at his dojo,  since 1976. Among his students is former Asian champion Takamasa Anai. and retired sumo wrestler Chiyotaikai Ryūji.

Achievements
1964 - All-Japan Championships (Openweight only) loss
1965 - World Championships (-80 kg) 2nd
 - All-Japan Championships (Openweight only) loss
1966 - All-Japan Championships (Openweight only) loss
1968 - All-Japan Selected Championships (Middleweight) 3rd

References

Japanese male judoka
1943 births
Sportspeople from Nagasaki Prefecture
People from Sasebo
Living people